Arunadhati Ghosh (born 1960) is a former Test and One Day International cricketer who represented India. She played a total of eight Tests and 11 ODIs.

References

1960 births
Cathedral and John Connon School alumni
India women One Day International cricketers
India women Test cricketers
Indian women cricketers
Living people